A cloud étage is a meteorological term used to delimit any one of three main altitude levels in the troposphere where certain cloud types usually form. The term is derived from the French word which means floor or storey, as in the floor of a  multi-storey building.  With the exception of the low étage, the altitude range of each level varies according to latitude from Earth's equator to the arctic and antarctic regions at the poles.

Correspondences for étages and cloud genus types 

The major high-level cloud types comprise cirrus, cirrocumulus, and cirrostratus.

Altocumulus and Altostratus are the main cloud types found in the middle levels of the troposphere.

Principal cloud types found in the low levels of the troposphere include stratocumulus, stratus, and small fair weather cumulus.

Several additional types usually form in the low or middle étages but typically extend into all three altitude levels as clouds with significant vertical extent.  These include nimbostratus, towering cumulus congestus, and cumulonimbus.

References

Clouds

fr:Nuage#Classification troposphérique